Women in Hospital is a 1977 West German drama film directed by Rolf Thiele and starring Horst Buchholz, Stephen Boyd, and Lillian Müller.

It was made at the Bavaria Studios in Munich. It was the final film of the director Rolf Thiele.

Cast

References

External links

1977 drama films
German drama films
West German films
Films directed by Rolf Thiele
Films set in hospitals
Films shot at Bavaria Studios
Films based on German novels
1970s German-language films
1970s German films